() is a term which means "lineage" in Spanish and Portuguese and has historically been used as a racial and social identifier. In the context of the Spanish Empire in the Americas, the term also refers to a now-discredited 20th-century theoretical framework which postulated that colonial society operated under a hierarchical race-based "caste system". From the outset, colonial Spanish America resulted in widespread intermarriage: unions of Spaniards, Amerindians, and Africans. A plethora of terms were used for people with mixed Spanish, Amerindian, and African ancestry in 18th-century casta paintings, but they are not known to have been widely used officially or unofficially in the Spanish Empire.

Etymology 
Casta is an Iberian word (existing in Spanish, Portuguese and other Iberian languages since the Middle Ages), meaning "lineage". It is documented in Spanish since 1417 and is linked to the Proto-Indo-European "Ger". The Portuguese casta gave rise to the English word caste during the early modern period.

Use of casta terminology
In the historical literature, how racial distinction, hierarchy, and social status functioned over time in colonial Spanish America has been an evolving and contested discussion. Although the term sistema de castas (system of castes) or sociedad de castas ("society of castes") are utilized in modern historical analyses to describe the social hierarchy based on race, with Spaniards at the apex, archival research shows that there is not a rigid "system" with fixed places for individuals. rather, a more fluid social structure where individuals could move from one category to another, or maintain or be given different labels depending on the context. In the eighteenth century, "casta paintings," imply a fixed racial hierarchy, but this genre may well have been an attempt to bring order into a system that was more fluid. "For colonial elites, casta paintings might well have been an attempt to fix in place rigid divisions based on race, even as they were disappearing in social reality."

Examination of registers in colonial Mexico put in question other narratives held by certain academics, such as Spanish immigrants who arrived to Mexico being almost exclusively men or that "pure Spanish" people were all part of a small powerful elite, as Spaniards were often the most numerous ethnic group in the colonial cities and there were menial workers and people in poverty who were of complete Spanish origin.

In New Spain (colonial Mexico) during the Mexican War of Independence, race and racial distinctions were an important issue and the end of imperial had a strong appeal. José María Morelos, who was registered as a Spaniard in his baptismal records, called for the abolition of the formal distinctions the imperial regime made between racial groups, advocating for "calling them one and all Americans." Morelos issued regulations in 1810 to prevent ethnic-based disturbances. "He who raises his voice should be immediately punished."In 1821 race was an issue in the negotiations resulting in the Plan of Iguala.

"Colonial Caste System" debate
The degree to which racial category labels had legal and social consequences has been subject to academic debate since the idea of a "caste system" was first developed by Polish-Venezuelan philologist Ángel Rosenblat and Mexican anthropologist Gonzalo Aguirre Beltrán in the 1940s. Both authors popularized the notion that racial status was the key organizing principle of Spanish colonial rule, a theory which became commonplace in the anglosphere during the mid and late 20th century. However, recent academic studies in Latin America have widely challenged this notion, considering it a flawed and ideologically-based reinterpretation of the colonial period.

Pilar Gonzalbo, in her study  (2013) discards the idea of the existence of a "caste system" or a "caste society" in New Spain, understood as a "social organization based on the race and supported by coercive power". Joanne Rappaport, in her book on colonial New Granada, rejects the caste system as an interpretative framework for that time, discussing both the legitimacy of a model valid for the entire colonial world and the usual association between "caste" and "race".

Similarly, Berta Ares' 2015 study on the Viceroyalty of Peru, notes that the term "casta" was barely used by colonial authorities which, according to her, casts doubt on the existence of a "caste system". Even by the 18th century, its use was rare and appeared in its plural form, "castas", characterized by its ambiguous meaning. The word did not specifically refer to sectors of the population who were of mixed race, but also included both Spaniards and Indians of lower socio-economic extraction, often used together with other terms such as plebe, vulgo, naciones, clases, calidades, otras gentes, etc.

In a detailed analysis of Mexican archival records published in 2018, Ben Vinson came to a similar conclusion.

There was considerable fluidity in society, with the same individuals being identified by different categories simultaneously or over time. Individuals self-identified by particular terms, often to shift their status from one category to another to their advantage. For example, both  and Spaniards were exempt from tribute obligations, but were both equally subject to the Inquisition. , on the other hand, paid tribute yet were exempt from the Inquisition.

Casta paintings produced largely in 18th-century Mexico have influenced modern understandings of race in Spanish America, a concept which began infiltrating Bourbon Spain from France and Northern Europe during this time. They purport to show a fixed "system" of racial hierarchy which has been disputed by modern academia. These paintings should be evaluated as the production by elites in New Spain for an elite viewership in both Spanish territories and abroad portrayals of mixtures of Spaniards with other ethnicities, some of which have been interpreted as being pejorative in nature or seeking social outrage. They are thus useful for understanding elites and their attitudes toward non-elites, and quite valuable as illustrations of aspects of material culture in the late colonial era.

"Purity of blood" and the evolution of racial classification
Certain authors have sought to link the castas in Latin America to the older Spanish concept of "purity of blood", limpieza de sangre, originating under Moorish rule, developed in Christian Spain to denote those without recent Jewish or Muslim heritage or, more widely, heritage from individuals convicted by the Spanish inquisition for heresy.

It was directly linked to religion and notions of legitimacy, lineage and honor following Spain's reconquest of Moorish territory and the degree to which it can be considered a precursor to the modern concept of race has been the subject of academic debate.. The Inquisition only allowed those Spaniards who could demonstrate not to have Jewish and Moorish blood to emigrate to Latin America, although this prohibition was frequently ignored and a number of Spanish Conquistadors were Jewish Conversos. Others, such as Juan Valiente, were Black Africans or had recent Moorish ancestry.

Both in Spain and in the New World Conversos who continued to practice Judaism in secret were aggressively prosecuted. Of the roughly 40 people executed by the Spanish Inquistion in Mexico, a significant number were convicted of being "Judaizers" (judaizantes) . Spanish Conquistador Luis de Carvajal y de la Cueva was prosecuted by the Inquisition for secretly practising Judaism and eventually died in prison.

In Spanish America, the idea of purity of blood also applied to Black Africans and indigenous peoples since, as Spaniards of Moorish and Jewish descent, they had not been Christian for various generations and were inherently suspect of engaging in religious heresy. In all Spanish territories, including Spain itself, evidence of lack of purity of blood had consequences for eligibility for office, entrance into the priesthood, and emigration to Spain's overseas territories. Having to produce genealogical records to prove one's pure ancestry gave rise to a trade in the creation of false genealogies, a practice which was already widespread in Spain itself.

This was no impediment for intermarriage between Spaniards and indigenous people, just as it had not been between Old and New Christians or different racial groups coexisting in late medieval and early modern Spain. The result was generations of mixed-race children who were typically considered Spaniards, and many of whom returned to Spain to join the ranks of the nobility, a notable example being Juan Cano Moctezuma.

However, starting in the late sixteenth century, some investigations of ancestry classified as "stains" any connection with Black Africans ("negros", which resulted in "mulatos") and sometimes mixtures with indigenous that produced Mestizos. While some illustrations from the period show men of African descent dressed in fashionable clothing and as aristocrats in upper-class surroundings, the idea that any hint of black ancestry was a stain developed by the end of the colonial period, a time in which biological racism began to emerge throughout the western world. This trend was illustrated in eighteenth-century paintings of racial hierarchy, known as casta paintings which led to 20th-century emergence of theories on a "Caste System" existing in Colonial Spanish America.

The idea in New Spain that native or "Indian" (indio) blood in a lineage was an impurity may well have come about as the optimism of the early Franciscans faded about creating Indian priests trained at the Colegio de Santa Cruz de Tlatelolco, which ceased that function in the mid-sixteenth century. In addition, the Indian nobility, which was recognized by the Spanish colonists, had declined in importance, and there were fewer formal marriages between Spaniards and indigenous women than during the early decades of the colonial era. In the seventeenth century in New Spain, the ideas of purity of blood became associated with "Spanishness and whiteness, but it came to work together with socio-economic categories", such that a lineage with someone engaged in work with their hands was tainted by that connection.

Indians in Central Mexico were affected by ideas of purity of blood from the other side. Crown decrees on purity of blood were affirmed by indigenous communities, which barred Indians from holding office who had any non-Indians (Spaniards and/or Black peoples) in their lineage. In indigenous communities "local caciques [rulers] and principales were granted a set of privileges and rights on the basis of their pre-Hispanic noble bloodlines and acceptance of the Catholic faith." Indigenous nobles submitted proofs (probanzas) of their purity of blood to affirm their rights and privileges that were extended to themselves and their communities. This supported the república de indios, a legal division of society that separated indigenous from non-Indians (república de españoles).

Casta classifications and legal consequences

In Spanish America racial categories were registered at local parishes upon baptism as required by the Spanish Crown. Initially in Spanish America there were three ethnic categories. They generally referred to the multiplicity of indigenous American peoples as "Indians" (indios). Those from Spain called themselves españoles. The third group were black Africans, called negros (lit. "blacks"), brought as slaves from the earliest days of Spanish Empire. Although intermarriage was widespread from the beginning of the colonial period, mestizos only slowly began to be recognized as a distinct ethnicity 150 years after the Spanish conquest of the Aztec Empire, prior to which they had simply been identified as Spaniards.

Although the number of Spanish women emigrating to New Spain was far higher than is often portrayed, they were fewer in number than men, as well as fewer black women than men, so the mixed-race offspring of Spaniards and of Black people were often the product of liaisons with indigenous women. The process of race mixture is now termed mestizaje, a term coined in the modern era.

In the 16th century, the term casta, a collective category for mixed-race individuals, came into existence as the numbers grew, particularly in urban areas. Nevertheless, during the first century and a half of the colonial era, the offspring of mixed marriages were registered as Spaniards and only Africans were registered as "Castas". The registry of "Mestizos" as "Castas" rather than "Spaniards" only become widespread in the last century of colonial rule.

The crown had divided the population of its overseas empire into two categories, separating Indians from non-Indians. Indigenous were the República de Indios, the other the República de Españoles, essentially the Hispanic sphere, so that Spaniards, Black people, and mixed-race castas were lumped into this category. Official censuses and ecclesiastical records noted an individual's racial category, so that these sources can be used to chart socio-economic standard, residence patterns, and other important data.

General racial groupings had their own set of privileges and restrictions, both legal and customary. So, for example, only Spaniards and indigenous, who were deemed to be the original societies of the Spanish dominions, had recognized aristocracies. In the population at large, access to social privileges and even at times a person's perceived and accepted racial classification, were predominantly determined by that person's socioeconomic standing in society.

Official censuses and ecclesiastical records noted an individual's racial category, so that these sources can be used to chart socio-economic standards, residence patterns, and other important data. Parish registers, where baptism, marriage, and burial were recorded, had three basic categories: español (Spaniards), indio, and color quebrado ("broken color", indicating a mixed-race person). In some parishes in colonial Mexico, indios were recorded with other non-Spaniards in the color quebrado register. Españoles and mestizos could be ordained as priests and were exempt from payment of tribute to the crown. Free black people, Amerindians, and mixed-race castas were required to pay tribute and barred from the priesthood. Being designated as an español or mestizo conferred social and financial advantages. Men of color began to apply to the Royal and Pontifical University of Mexico, but in 1688 Bishop Juan de Palafox y Mendoza attempted to prevent their entrance by drafting new regulations barring black peoples and mulattoes. In 1776, the crown issued the Royal Pragmatic on Marriage, taking approval of marriages away from the couple and placing it in their parents' hands. The marriage between Luisa de Abrego, a free black domestic servant from Seville and Miguel Rodríguez, a white Segovian conquistador in 1565 in St. Augustine (Spanish Florida), is the first known and recorded Christian marriage anywhere in the continental United States.

Long lists of different terms found in casta paintings do not appear in official documentation or anywhere outside these paintings. Only counts of Spaniards, mestizos, black peoples and mulattoes, and indigenes (indios), were recorded in censuses.

Casta paintings of the 18th century

Artwork created mainly in eighteenth-century Mexico purports to show race mixture as a hierarchy. These paintings have had tremendous influence in how scholars have approached difference in the colonial era, but should not be taken as definitive description of racial difference. For approximately a century, casta paintings were by elite artists for an elite viewership. They ceased to be produced following Mexico's independence in 1821 when casta designations were abolished. The vast majority of casta paintings were produced in Mexico, by a variety of artists, with a single group of canvases clearly identified for 18th-century Peru. In the colonial era, artists primarily created religious art and portraits, but in the eighteenth century, casta paintings emerged as a completely secular genre of art. An exception to that is the painting by Luis de Mena, a single canvas that has the central figure of the Virgin of Guadalupe and a set of casta groupings. Most sets of casta paintings have 16 separate canvases, but a few, such as Mena's, Ignacio María Barreda, and the anonymous painting in the Museo de Virreinato in Tepozotlan, Mexico, are frequently reproduced as examples of the genre, likely because their composition gives a single, tidy image of the racial classification (from the elite viewpoint).

It is unclear why casta paintings emerged as a genre, why they became such a popular genre of artwork, who commissioned them, and who collected them. One scholar suggests they can be seen as "proud renditions of the local," at a point when American-born Spaniards began forming a clearer identification with their place of birth rather than metropolitan Spain. The single-canvas casta artwork could well have been as a curiosity or souvenir for Spaniards to take home to Spain; two frequently reproduced casta paintings are Mena's and Barreda's, both of which are in Madrid museums. There is only one set of casta paintings definitively done in Peru, commissioned by Viceroy Manuel Amat y Junyent (1770), and sent to Spain for the Cabinet of Natural History of the Prince of Asturias.

The influence of the European Enlightenment on the Spanish empire led to an interest in organizing knowledge and scientific description might have resulted in the commission of many series of pictures that document the racial combinations that existed in Spanish territories in the Americas. Many sets of these paintings still exist (around one hundred complete sets in museums and private collections and many more individual paintings), of varying artistic quality, usually consisting of sixteen paintings representing as many racial combinations. It must be emphasized that these paintings reflected the views of the economically established Criollo society and officialdom, but not all Criollos were pleased with casta paintings. One remarked that they show "what harms us, not what benefits us, what dishonors us, not what ennobles us." Many paintings are in Spain in major museums, but many remain in private collections in Mexico, perhaps commissioned and kept because they show the character of late colonial Mexico and a source of pride.

Some of the finer sets were done by prominent Mexican artists, such as José de Alcíbar, Miguel Cabrera, José de Ibarra, José Joaquín Magón, (who painted two sets); Juan Patricio Morlete Ruiz, José de Páez, and Juan Rodríguez Juárez. One of Magón's sets includes descriptions of the "character and moral standing" of his subjects. These artists worked together in the painting guilds of New Spain. They were important transitional artists in 18th-century casta painting. At least one Spaniard, Francisco Clapera, also contributed to the casta genre. In general, little is known of most artists who did sign their work; most casta paintings are unsigned.

Certain authors have interpreted the overall theme of these paintings as representing the "supremacy of the Spaniards", the possibility that mixtures of Spaniards and Spanish-Indian offspring could return to the status of Spaniards through marriage to Spaniards over generations, what can be considered "restoration of racial purity," or "racial mending" was seen visually in many sets of casta paintings. It was also articulated by a visitor to Mexico, Don Pedro Alonso O'Crouley, in 1774. "If the mixed-blood is the offspring of a Spaniard and an Indian, the stigma [of race mixture] disappears at the third step in descent because it is held as systematic that a Spaniard and an Indian produce a mestizo; a mestizo and a Spaniard, a castizo; and a castizo and a Spaniard, a Spaniard. The admixture of Indian blood should not indeed be regarded as a blemish, since the provisions of law give the Indian all that he could wish for, and Philip II granted to mestizos the privilege of becoming priests. On this consideration is based the common estimation of descent from a union of Indian and European or creole Spaniard."

O'Crouley says that the same process of restoration of racial purity does not occur over generations for European-African offspring marrying whites. “From the union of a Spaniard and a Negro the mixed-blood retains the stigma for generations without losing the original quality of a mulato." Casta paintings show increasing whitening over generations with the mixes of Spaniards and Africans. The sequence is the offspring of a Spaniard + Negra, Mulatto; Spaniard with a Mulatta, Morisco; Spaniard with a Morisca, Albino (a racial category, derived from Alba, "white"); Spaniard with an Albina, Torna atrás, or "throw back" black. Negro, Mulatto, and Morisco were labels found in colonial-era documentation, but Albino and Torna atrás exist only as fairly standard categories in casta paintings.

In contrast, mixtures with Black people, both by Indians and Spaniards, led to a bewildering number of combinations, with "fanciful terms" to describe them. Instead of leading to a new racial type or equilibrium, they led to apparent disorder. Terms such as the above-mentioned tente en el aire ("floating in mid air") and no te entiendo ("I don't understand you")—and others based on terms used for animals: coyote and lobo (wolf).

Castas defined themselves in different ways, and how they were recorded in official records was a process of negotiation between the casta and the person creating the document, whether it was a birth certificate, a marriage certificate or a court deposition. In real life, many casta individuals were assigned different racial categories in different documents, revealing the malleable nature of racial identity in colonial, Spanish American society.

Some paintings depicted the supposed "innate" character and quality of people because of their birth and ethnic origin. For example, according to one painting by José Joaquín Magón, a mestizo (mixed Indian + Spanish) was considered generally humble, tranquil, and straightforward; while another painting claims "from Lobo and Indian woman is born the Cambujo, one usually slow, lazy, and cumbersome." Ultimately, the casta paintings are reminders of the colonial biases in modern human history that linked a caste/ethnic society based on descent, skin color, social status, and one's birth.

Often, casta paintings depicted commodity items from Latin America like pulque, the fermented alcohol drink of the lower classes. Painters depicted interpretations of pulque that were attributed to specific castas.

The Indias in casta paintings depict them as partners to Spaniards, Black people, and castas, and thus part of Hispanic society. But in a number of casta paintings, they are also shown apart from "civilized society," such as Miguel Cabrera's Indios Gentiles, or indios bárbaros or Chichimecas barely clothed indigenous in a wild, setting. In the single-canvas casta painting by José María Barreda, there are a canonical 16 casta groupings and then in a separate cell below are "Mecos". Although the so-called "barbarian Indians" (indios bárbaros) were fierce warriors on horseback, indios in casta paintings are not shown as bellicose, but as weak, a trope that developed in the colonial era. A casta painting by Luis de Mena that is often reproduced as an example of the genre shows an unusual couple with a pale, well-dressed Spanish woman paired with a nearly naked indio, producing a Mestizo offspring. "The aberrant combination not only mocks social protocol but also seems to underscore the very artificiality of a casta system that pretends to circumscribe social fluidity and economic mobility." The image "would have seemed frankly bizarre and offensive by eighteenth-century Creole elites, if taken literally", but if the pair were considered allegorical figures, the Spanish woman represents "Europe" and the indio "America." The image "functions as an allegory for the 'civilizing' and Christianizing process."

Sample sets of casta paintings
Presented here are casta lists from three sets of paintings. Note that they only agree on the first five combinations, which are essentially the Indian-White ones. There is no agreement on the Black mixtures, however. Also, no one list should be taken as "authoritative". These terms would have varied from region to region and across time periods. The lists here probably reflect the names that the artist knew or preferred, the ones the patron requested to be painted, or a combination of both.

Casta paintings

See also

 Caste system
 Castizo
 Dominant minority
 Filipino Mestizos
 Mestizo
 Mexican art
 Ordenanzas del Baratillo de México
 Race and ethnicity in Latin America
 La Raza
 Zambo

References

Further reading

Race and race mixture

Burns, Kathryn. "Unfixing Race," in Rereading the Black Legend: The Discourses of Religious and Racial Difference in the Renaissance Empires, ed. Margaret Greer et al. Chicago: University of Chicago Press 2007.

Chance, John K. Race and class in Colonial Oaxaca, Stanford, Stanford University Press, 1978.
Cope, R. Douglas. The Limits of Racial Domination: Plebeian Society in Colonial Mexico City, 1660-1720. Madison: University of Wisconsin Press, 1994. 
Fisher, Andrew B. and Matthew D. O'Hara, eds. Imperial Subjects: Race and Identity in Colonial Latin America. Durham: Duke University Press 2009.

Gonzalbo Aizpuru, Pilar, "La trampa de las castas," in Alberro, Solange y Gonzalbo Aizpuru, Pilar, La sociedad novohispana. Estereotipos y realidades, México, El Colegio de México, 2013, p. 15-193.
Hill, Ruth. "Casta as Culture and the Sociedad de Castas a Literature," in Interpreting Colonialism. ed. Byron Wells and Philip Stewart. New York: Oxford University Press 2004.
Jackson, Robert H. Race, Caste, and Status: Indians in Colonial Spanish America. Albuquerque: University of New Mexico Press 1999.
Leibsohn, Dana, and Barbara E. Mundy, "Reckoning with Mestizaje," Vistas: Visual Culture in Spanish America, 1520-1820 (2015). http://www.fordham.edu/vistas.
MacLachlan, Colin M. and Jaime E. Rodríguez O. The Forging of the Cosmic Race: A Reinterpretation of Colonial Mexico, expanded edition. Berkeley: University of California Press, 1990. 
Martínez, María Elena, Genealogical Fictions: Limpieza de Sangre, Religion, and Gender in Colonial Mexico, Stanford: Stanford University Press 2008,

Mörner, Magnus. Race Mixture in the History of Latin America. Boston: Little Brown, 1967.
O'Crouley, Pedro Alonso. A Description of the Kingdom of New Spain. Translated and edited by Sean Galvin. John Howell Books 1972.
O'Toole, Rachel Sarah. Bound Lives: Africans, Indians, and the Making of Race in Colonial Peru. Pittsburgh: University of Pittsburgh Press 2012. 
Pitt-Rivers, Julian, "Sobre la palabra casta", América Indígena, 36-3, 1976, pp. 559-586.
Ramos-Kittrell, Jesús. Playing in the Cathedral: Music, Race, and Status in New Spain. New York: Oxford University Press 2016.
Rappaport, Joanne. The Disappearing Mestizo: Configuring Difference in the Colonial Kingdom of New Granada. Durham: Duke University Press 2014.
Rosenblat, Angel. El mestizaje y las castas coloniales: La población indígena y el mestizaje en América. buenos Aires, Editorial Nova 1954.
Seed, Patricia. To Love, Honor, and Obey in Colonial Mexico: Conflicts Over Marriage Choice, 1574-1821. Stanford: Stanford University Press, 1988. 

Twinam, Ann. Purchasing Whiteness: Pardos, Mulatos, and the Quest for Social Mobility in the Spanish Indies. Stanford: Stanford University Press 2015.

Vinson, Ben III. Before Mestizaje: The Frontiers of Race and Caste in Colonial Mexico. New York: Cambridge University Press 2018

Casta painting

Carrera, Magali M. Imagining Identity in New Spain: Race, Lineage, and the Colonial Body in Portraiture and Casta Paintings. Austin, University of Texas Press, 2003. 

Estrada de Gerlero, Elena Isabel. "Representations of 'Heathen Indians' in Mexican Casta Painting," in New World Orders, Ilona Katzew, ed. New York: Americas Society Art Gallery 1996.
García Sáiz, María Concepción. Las castas mexicanas: Un género pictórico americano. Milan: Olivetti 1989.
García Sáiz, María Concepción, "The Artistic Development of Casta Painting," in New World Orders, Ilona Katzew, ed. New York: Americas Society Art Gallery, 1996.
Katzew, Ilona. "Casta Painting: Identity and Social Stratification in Colonial Mexico," New York University, 1996.
Katzew, Ilona, ed. New World Orders: Casta Painting and Colonial Latin America. New York: Americas Society Art Gallery 1996.
Katzew, Ilona. Casta Painting: Images of Race in Eighteenth-Century Mexico. New Haven: Yale University Press, 2004.

External links

"Casta Paintings" An example of one of the many things that can be found in Breamore House that has attracted a lot of interest over the years. This collection of Casta paintings is believed to be the only one in United Kingdom. The collection of fourteen paintings, was commissioned for the King of Spain in 1715 and painted by Mexican artist Juan Rodríguez Juárez.
Castas paintings and discussion on Nuestros Ranchos Genealogy of Mexico website
Safo, Nova. "Casta Paintings: Inventing Race Through Art/Mexican Art Genre Reveals 18th-Century Attitudes on Racial Mixing." The Tavis Smiley Show. June 30, 2004.
Soong, Roland. Racial Classifications in Latin America. 1999.

Former peoples of the African diaspora
African–Native American relations
Spanish colonization of the Americas
New Spain
Colonial Mexico
Colonial Peru
 
Spanish language
Racism
Interracial relationships